George Harrold Carswell (December 22, 1919 – July 13, 1992) was a United States circuit judge of the United States Court of Appeals for the Fifth Circuit and a United States district judge of the United States District Court for the Northern District of Florida. He was also an unsuccessful nominee to the United States Supreme Court in 1970.

Education and career

Carswell was born in Irwinton, Wilkinson County, Georgia. He graduated from Duke University with an Artium Baccalaureus degree in 1941 and briefly attended the University of Georgia School of Law before joining the United States Navy at the beginning of World War II. Carswell did six months of postgraduate work at the United States Naval Academy and served in the Pacific aboard the heavy cruiser  as a lieutenant in the United States Naval Reserve; he was discharged in 1945 (when the war ended). Carswell graduated with a Bachelor of Laws from the Walter F. George School of Law at Mercer University in 1948. Griffin Bell, 72nd Attorney General of the United States, was one of Carswell's classmates at Mercer. Carswell unsuccessfully ran for a seat in the Georgia legislature in the fall of 1948. He then moved to Tallahassee, Florida, where he worked as a private attorney from 1948 to 1953. In 1953, he was appointed United States Attorney for the Northern District of Florida by President Dwight D. Eisenhower; Carswell served in this position until 1958.

Personal life

Carswell married his wife Virginia (née Simmons) in 1944.

Federal judicial service

Carswell was nominated by President Dwight D. Eisenhower on March 6, 1958, to a seat on the United States District Court for the Northern District of Florida vacated by Judge Dozier A. DeVane. He was confirmed by the United States Senate on March 31, 1958, and received his commission on April 10, 1958. He served as Chief Judge from 1958 to 1969. His service terminated on June 27, 1969, due to his elevation to the Fifth Circuit.

Carswell was nominated by President Richard Nixon on May 12, 1969, to the United States Court of Appeals for the Fifth Circuit, to a new seat authorized by 82 Stat. 184. He was confirmed by the Senate on June 19, 1969, and received his commission on June 20, 1969. His service terminated on April 20, 1970, due to his resignation.

Supreme Court nomination

On January 19, 1970, President Nixon nominated Carswell to be an associate justice of the United States Supreme Court to replace Abe Fortas, who had resigned in May 1969. Nixon had earlier nominated Clement Haynsworth to succeed Fortas, but the nomination was rejected by the U.S. Senate.

The Senate Judiciary Committee opened hearings on the nomination eight days after Nixon made the announcement; and the president anticipated that the nomination would proceed smoothly. Before they began, however, the press uncovered a speech delivered by Carswell during his unsuccessful Georgia legislative bid in 1948 that espoused the principles of white supremacy. In the August 2, 1948 speech to the American Legion chapter at Gordon, Georgia, he said:

When the story broke, Carswell said "specifically and categorically, I renounce and reject the words themselves and the thought they represent; they are abhorrent." The NAACP, upon learning of Carswell's racist comments, declared their opposition to Carswell's nomination and asked that his appointment be rejected by the Senate. U.S. Attorney General John Mitchell, citing an extensive background check by the Justice Department, was willing to forgive, stating that it was unfair to criticize Carswell for "political remarks made 22 years ago".

Other issues regarding Carswell's civil rights record soon also came to light, such as him being involved in turning a public golf course into a segregated private club in Tallahassee, Florida, signing a deed to property which contained a racially restrictive covenant and prolonging the duration of a school desegregation case from 1963 to 1967.

Meanwhile, feminists accused him of being an opponent of women's rights. Various women, including U.S. Congresswoman Patsy Mink and Betty Friedan, testified before the Senate, opposed his nomination. They described a case in which Judge Carswell refused a rehearing for a complainant who was the mother of preschool children.

During the hearings concerns about Carswell's mediocre skill as a jurist were raised as well. By one assessment, it was reported, 40 percent of his rulings had been overturned on appeal. Louis H. Pollak, then dean of Yale Law School, testified that: "There is nothing in these opinions that suggests more than at very best a level of modest competence, no more than that." Senator George McGovern of South Dakota said of Carswell, "I find his record to be distinguished largely by two qualities: racism and mediocrity." In response, Senator Roman Hruska of Nebraska suggested that critics were focusing on Carswell's scholarship because they didn't like that he was a Southerner. Later, Hruska famously told reporters:

The remark was criticized by many as being anti-semitic, which further damaged Carswell's cause.

Despite the testimony given about his civil rights record, on February 16, 1970, the Judiciary Committee voted 13–4 to forward the nomination to the full Senate with a favorable recommendation. After opponents of Carswell failed, by a 44–52 vote, to return the nomination to the Judiciary committee for further review on April 6, the Senate rejected Carswell's nomination on April 8, 1970, by a 45–51 vote, with 13 Republicans joining 38 Democrats in voting "no".

Not since Grover Cleveland, in 1893–94, had the Senate rejected two of the president's Supreme Court nominees. President Nixon accused Democrats of having an anti-Southern bias as a result saying, "... the real reason for their rejection was their legal philosophy, a philosophy that I share, of strict construction of the Constitution, and also the accident of their birth, the fact that they were born in the South ... I understand the bitter feelings of millions of Americans who live in the South about the act of regional discrimination that took place in the Senate yesterday." Later that April, the president nominated Harry Blackmun to fill the Fortas vacancy. He was later confirmed in a 94–0 vote on May 12.

U.S. Senate campaign

On April 20, 1970, Carswell resigned from his judicial position to run for the Republican nomination for the U.S. Senate from Florida. His opponent was U.S. Representative William C. Cramer of St. Petersburg. Expecting to benefit politically in Florida from the rejection of Judge Carswell to the Supreme Court, aides of either Governor Claude R. Kirk, Jr., or U.S. Senator Edward Gurney of Winter Park urged Carswell to resign from the bench to run for the Senate seat being vacated by the long-term Democrat Spessard Holland. Cramer claimed that Gurney had in a 1968 "gentlemen's agreement" agreed to support him for the seat. Gurney declined to discuss the "gentlemen's agreement" with Cramer but said that he and Cramer, who had been House colleagues, had "totally different opinions on this. That is ancient history, and I see no point in reviving things. … If I told my complete version of the matter, Cramer would not believe me, and I don't want Bill angry at me." Gurney claimed that he was unaware that Cramer had considered running for the Senate in 1968 and had deferred that year to Gurney, with the expectation that Cramer would seek the other Senate seat in 1970 with Gurney's backing.

When Kirk and Gurney endorsed Carswell, Lieutenant Governor Ray C. Osborne, a Kirk appointee, abandoned his own primary challenge to Cramer. Years later, Kirk said that he "should have stuck with Osborne", later an attorney from Boca Raton, and not encouraged Carswell to run. Kirk also said that he had not "created" Carswell's candidacy, as the media had depicted.

Carswell said that he ran for the Senate because he wanted to "confront the liberals who shot me down" but denied that Kirk took advantage of the failed confirmation to thwart Cramer. "... Neither then nor now did I feel used. ... What feud they had was their own." Carswell said that he had no knowledge of a "gentlemen's agreement" between Gurney and Cramer and had considered running for the Senate even before he was nominated to the Supreme Court.

Carswell instead blamed his loss  on the "dark evil winds of liberalism" and the "northern press and its knee-jerking followers in the Senate".

Carswell reported that U.S. Representative Rogers Clark Ballard Morton of Maryland, who was also in 1970 the Republican national chairman, had told him that he believed Carswell was "clearly electable" and that Cramer should not risk the loss of a House seat that had been in Republican hands since 1955. Cramer, however, claimed that Morton had termed the intraparty machinations against Cramer the worst "double crosses" that Morton had ever witnessed in the party. President Nixon sat out the Carswell-Cramer primary even though in 1969 he had strongly urged Cramer to enter the race. Deputy Press Secretary Gerald Lee Warren said that Nixon had "no knowledge and no involvement" in Carswell's candidacy.

Gurney claimed that Harry S. Dent, Sr., a South Carolina political consultant with ties to Republican U.S. Senator Strom Thurmond of South Carolina, had urged Carswell to run. Carswell further secured endorsements from actors John Wayne and Gene Autry and retained Richard Viguerie, the direct mail specialist from Falls Church, Virginia, to raise funds.

Cramer defeated Carswell, 220,553 to 121,281. A third contender, businessman George Balmer, received the remaining 10,947 votes. Thereafter, Cramer was defeated, 54%—46%, by the Democrat Lawton Chiles of Lakeland in a heavily Democratic year.

Senate Republican Leader Hugh Scott of Pennsylvania, who opposed Carswell's confirmation to the Supreme Court, said that Carswell "was asking for it, and he got what he deserved".

Later years
In 1976, Carswell pled guilty to battery for advances he made to an undercover police officer in a Tallahassee men's room. Then, in September 1979, Carswell was attacked and beaten by a man whom he had invited to his Atlanta, Georgia, hotel room in similar circumstances. Until these incidents there had been no public talk of Carswell's sexuality.

Carswell subsequently returned to his private law practice before retiring. He died in 1992 of lung cancer; his wife, Virginia, died in 2009.

See also 
 Unsuccessful nominations to the Supreme Court of the United States
 George L. Thurston III

Notes

References

Sources
 

1919 births
1992 deaths
20th-century American judges
20th-century American lawyers
Bisexual men
Deaths from lung cancer in Florida
Duke University alumni
Florida Republicans
Judges of the United States Court of Appeals for the Fifth Circuit
Judges of the United States District Court for the Northern District of Florida
Mercer University alumni
People from Tallahassee, Florida
People from Wilkinson County, Georgia
United States Attorneys for the Northern District of Florida
United States court of appeals judges appointed by Richard Nixon
United States district court judges appointed by Dwight D. Eisenhower
United States Navy officers
Unsuccessful nominees to the United States Supreme Court
LGBT conservatism in the United States
United States Navy personnel of World War II